Kamal Saaliti (born 2 August 1979 in Midar) is a Moroccan-born Norwegian football striker who currently plays for Årvoll.

He joined Hønefoss ahead of the 2002 season, having previously played for Frigg Oslo as well as Vålerenga in the Norwegian Premier League. He got only 2 Premier League games in 1998 and 1999, but has played 157 league games for Hønefoss. For half a year in 2003 he played for Sassari Torres 1903 in Italy. He scored Hønefoss first goal in Tippeligaen against Haugesund. On 5 January 2011 he signed with Sandnes Ulf.

Career statistics

References

External links
Profile on Hønefoss website

1979 births
Living people
Footballers from Oslo
Norwegian footballers
Eliteserien players
Norwegian First Division players
Norwegian Second Division players
Frigg Oslo FK players
Vålerenga Fotball players
Hønefoss BK players
Sandnes Ulf players
Jevnaker IF players
Expatriate footballers in Italy
Norwegian expatriate footballers
Moroccan emigrants to Norway
Association football forwards
S.E.F. Torres 1903 players
Norwegian expatriate sportspeople in Italy